Sphecosoma gracilis is a moth in the subfamily Arctiinae. It was described by Peter Jörgensen in 1932. It is found in Paraguay.

References

Moths described in 1932
Sphecosoma